Grass Valley is a city in Nevada County, California, United States. As of the 2010 United States Census, its population was 12,860.

History

Grass Valley, which was originally known as Boston Ravine and later named Centerville, dates from the California Gold Rush, as does nearby Nevada City. Gold was discovered at Gold Hill in October 1850 and population grew around the mine. When a post office was established in 1851, it was renamed Grass Valley the next year for unknown reasons. The town incorporated in 1860.

The essential history of Grass Valley mining belongs to the North Star, Empire and Idaho-Maryland mines, for continuous production over a span of years.  From 1868 until 1900, the Idaho-Maryland mine was the most productive in the district. From 1900 until 1925, the North Star and the Empire produced the most gold in the county. In 1932, the Empire and North Star were physically connected at the 4600-foot level and 5300-foot level.

Grass Valley has the Empire Mine and North Star Mine, two of California's richest mines. George Starr, manager of the Empire Mine, and William Bowers Bourn II, the owner, donated mine property which became Memorial Park. Wiliam Bourn Jr. had taken over management of the Empire Mine in 1878 after his father's death, replacing water power with steam. In 1884, Bourn purchased and rejuvenated the North Star mine.  The Idaho and Maryland mines were consolidated by Samuel P. Dorsey in 1893. In 1925, Errol MacBoyle acquired the Idaho-Maryland. By 1938, the Idaho-Maryland was the second largest gold producer in the country.  However, gold mining operations in the area ended during WWII, due to War Production Board Limitation Order 208.  After the war, renewed operations were attempted, but according to Gage McKinney, "...by the mid-1950s mining was no longer profitable in what had been the richest gold mining district in California."

Many of those who came to settle in Grass Valley were tin miners from Cornwall, United Kingdom. Most arrived between 1860 and 1895, composing three quarters of Grass Valley's population.

Grass Valley still holds on to its Cornish heritage, with events such as its annual Cornish Christmas and St Piran's Day celebrations. Cornish pasties are a local favorite dish with a few restaurants in town specializing in recipes handed down from the original immigrant generation. Grass Valley is also twinned with Bodmin in Cornwall (UK).

There was formerly a (short-lived) Roman Catholic Diocese of Grass Valley in 1868-1884, later relocated in Sacramento (and now a titular see).

The Grass Valley K-Mart store was one of the nation's few remaining still open and the last one in California. It closed in 2021.

Geography
Grass Valley is located at  (39.219215, -121.058414).

A variety of igneous and metamorphic rock supports Grass Valley. Granitic rock such as quartz diorite underlies the downtown core and extends south along Highway 49. Metavolcanic rock and diabase underlie areas around the granitic zone. Neighborhoods around Nevada County Golf Course and Sierra Nevada Memorial Hospital are underlain by ultramafic rock which supports infertile soils of the Dubakella series. Here the vegetation is sparse considering the high average annual precipitation, with much grassland, and forested areas are often dominated by several species of oaks and the crooked, thin-crowned gray pine. Luxuriant forest dominated by straight, dense ponderosa pine inhabits the more fertile soils, which include Musick series on granitic rock and Sites series on mafic or metamorphic rock.

Climate
Grass Valley has a hot-summer Mediterranean climate (Köppen Csa) with warm to hot, dry summers and wet, cool, rainy winters. Summer is very dry, but thunderstorms may occur. Winter rains contribute to a heavy fuel-loading of brush and grass, which dry out during the summer, posing a wildfire hazard. Snow occurs at times.

Demographics

2010
The 2010 United States Census reported that Grass Valley had a population of 12,860. The racial makeup of Grass Valley was 11,493 (89.4%) White, 208 (1.6%) Native American, 188 (1.5%) Asian, 46 (0.4%) African American, 9 (0.1%) Pacific Islander, 419 (3.3%) from other races, and 497 (3.9%) from two or more races. Hispanics or Latinos of any race were 1,341 persons (10.4%).

The census reported that 12,401 people (96.4% of the population) lived in households, 118 (0.9%) lived in noninstitutionalized group quarters, and 341 (2.7%) were institutionalized.

Of the 6,077 households, 1,544 (25.4%) had children under the age of 18 living in them, 1,665 (27.4%) were opposite-sex married couples living together, 980 (16.1%) had a female householder with no husband present, and 316 (5.2%) had a male householder with no wife present, 466 (7.7%) were unmarried opposite-sex partnerships, and 33 (0.5%) were same-sex married couples or partnerships. About 2,605 households (42.9%) were made up of individuals, and 1,415 (23.3%) had someone living alone who was 65 years of age or older. The average household size was 2.04. The 2,961 families (48.7% of all households) had an average family size of 2.78.

The population was distributed as 2,625 people (20.4%) under the age of 18, 1,146 people (8.9%) aged 18 to 24, 2,882 people (22.4%) aged 25 to 44, 3,183 people (24.8%) aged 45 to 64, and 3,024 people (23.5%) who were 65 years of age or older. The median age was 43.2 years. For every 100 females, there were 78.9 males.  For every 100 females age 18 and over, there were 73.5 males.

The 6,637 housing units averaged 1,399.3 per square mile (540.3/km), of which 2,391 (39.3%) were owner-occupied, and 3,686 (60.7%) were occupied by renters. The homeowner vacancy rate was 4.0%; the rental vacancy rate was 6.7%; 4,663 people (36.3% of the population) lived in owner-occupied housing units and 7,738 people (60.2%) lived in rental housing units.

2000
As of the census of 2000, 10,922 people, 5,016 households, and 2,678 families resided in the city.

Of the 5,016 households, 26.5% had children under the age of 18 living with them, 32.4% were married couples living together, 16.3% had a female householder with no husband present, and 46.6% were not families.  About 39.1% of all households were made up of individuals, and 20.3% had someone living alone who was 65 years of age or older.  The average household size was 2.13 and the average family size was 2.80 people.

The median income for a household in the city was $28,182, and for a family was $33,220. Males had a median income of $32,568 versus $21,915 for females. The per capita income for the city was $16,877. About 12.9% of families and 14.9% of the population were below the poverty line, including 20.0% of those under age 18 and 6.3% of those age 65 or over.

Government
Grass Valley has been a charter city since it was incorporated in 1893.  It uses a council-manager form of government.

State and federal representation

Economy

The combined communities of Grass Valley and Nevada City have a fairly diversified economy. The Gold Rush days left a historical legacy and tourism and the related services sector constitute the bulk of the local economy. Many of those who do not commute to the Sacramento Valley work locally in retail, wholesale, trade, engineering, manufacturing, construction, and other businesses, as well in local and state government. A significant number of high-tech electronics companies are in the area.

Another significant sector of the local economy is agriculture, as the soil in Nevada County is quite fertile. Around the time of the Gold Rush, farmers planted orchards, vegetables, and other produce as ranchers brought in cattle, sheep, and other livestock. While the proportion of land dedicated to agriculture has significantly decreased over the last few decades, agriculture continues to be an important aspect of the local economy, including organic agricultural products. Nevada County has also become known for its growing wine industry.

Retail employers in Grass Valley include Raley's, Safeway, CVS Pharmacy, Walgreens, Starbucks, GNC, Jamba Juice, Staples and Hills Flat Lumber Co. Fast-food chain restaurants in Grass Valley include Taco Bell, McDonald's, Carl's Jr., Jimboy's Tacos and KFC. Other major employers include Nevada Union High School, Nevada Irrigation District, Sierra Nevada Memorial Hospital, Golden Empire Nursing and Rehab Center, and Briar Patch Food Co-op.

The Grass Valley Group is a media technology research and development company founded in the city in 1959.

Education

Higher education
Nevada County Campus of Sierra College

Public primary and secondary schools
Bear River High School
Bell Hill Academy
Bitney College Prep Charter High School
Cottage Hill Elementary School
Forest Charter School
Grass Valley Charter School
Lyman Gilmore Middle School
Magnolia Intermediate School
Nevada Union High School
Nevada City School District
Pleasant Ridge Elementary School
Scotten Elementary School
Sierra Academy of Expeditionary Learning
Union Hill Middle School
William and Marian Ghidotti Early College High School
Yuba River Charter School
Clear Creek Elementary School

Public libraries
Josiah Royce Public Library

Transportation
Grass Valley is at the intersection of State Route 49 and State Route 20.  Public transportation is served by the Gold Country Stage  and limited to the urban areas.

Designated historical landmarks

 Empire Mine State Historic Park (CHL#298)
 Grass Valley Public Library (NRHP#92000267)
 Holbrooke Hotel (CHL#914)
 Home of Lola Montez (CHL#292)
 Home of Lotta Crabtree (CHL#293)
 Lyman Gilmore Middle School
 Mount Saint Mary's Convent and Academy (CHL#855)
 North Star Mine Powerhouse (CHL#843)
 Overland Emigrant Trail (CHL#799)
 Site of the First Discoveries of Quartz Gold in California (CHL#297)

Popular culture
Wallace Stegner's Angle of Repose features Grass Valley.

Sister cities
Grass Valley has two sister cities:
 Bodmin, Cornwall, United Kingdom
 Limana, Italy

Notable people

 Sam Aanestad, dentist and politician
 Cecelia Ager, American film critic and reporter
 Patrick Brice, film director, actor
 Hunter Burgan, musician
 John Cardiel, professional skateboarder
 Lotta Crabtree, 19th-century actress
 Pete Daley, baseball player
 Jonathan Dayton, film director
 Alonzo Delano, first city treasurer
Mary Florence Denton, educator in Japan
 Matt DiBenedetto, NASCAR driver
 Brodie Farber, professional fighter
 Arthur De Wint Foote, mining engineer
 Mary Hallock Foote, author and illustrator
 Lisa Mispley Fortier, NCAA WBB coach
 John Arthur Gellatly, Lieutenant Governor of Washington
 Lyman Gilmore, historically significant pilot
 Justin Gross, voiceover actor
 Charles Scott Haley, mining engineer, expert in the field of placer gold deposits.
 Fred Hargesheimer, World War II pilot, philanthropist
 John Flint Kidder, builder, historically significant railroad owner
 Sarah Kidder, historically significant railroad owner
 Mark Meckler, political activist
 Lola Montez, 19th-century dancer
 Joanna Newsom, American singer-songwriter
 Hans Ostrom, writer and professor
 Jim Pagliaroni, professional baseball player
 Mike Pinder, musician
 Charles H. Prisk, newspaper editor-publisher
 William F. Prisk, State Senator, newspaper editor-publisher
 Chuck Ragan, singer, songwriter, guitarist
 Dennis Richmond, news anchor
 John Rollin Ridge, writer
 Clint Ritchie, actor
 Tim Rossovich, professional football player, actor
 Richard Roundtree, actor
 Josiah Royce, philosopher
 Gabe Ruediger, professional fighter
 Chris Senn, professional skateboarder
 Jeremy Sisto, actor
 Meadow Sisto, actress
 John Aloysius Stanton, painter, born in Grass Valley.
 Wallace Stegner, author and winner of the Pulitzer Prize
 J. Christopher Stevens, assassinated U.S. ambassador to Libya, born in Grass Valley
 Brad Sweet, World of Outlaws Sprint Car Driver and 3X Champion
 Clint Walker, actor
 William Watt, miner, State Senator, University of California Regent

See also
 Little Grass Valley, California
 Cyan Engineering

References

External links

 
 The Union - local newspaper
 Grass Valley visitor information
 Grass Valley grocer's ledger, 1894-1895 collection. California State Library, California History Room.
 Grass Valley mining helmets and equipment collection. California State Library, California History Room.

 
Cities in Nevada County, California
Cities in Sacramento metropolitan area
Mining communities of the California Gold Rush
Populated places in the Sierra Nevada (United States)
Cornish-American history
1893 establishments in California
Populated places established in 1893
Incorporated cities and towns in California